Stemmatophora albifimbrialis is a species of snout moth. It is found in  Korea, Japan, China and Taiwan.

The ground colour of the forewings is yellowish brown. Adults are on wing from April to August.

References

Moths described in 1906
Pyralini
Moths of Asia